Bernard Poignant (born 19 September 1945 in Vannes, Brittany) is a French politician and Member of the European Parliament for the west of France. He is a member of the Socialist Party, which is part of the Party of European Socialists, and sits on the European Parliament's Committee on Fisheries and its Committee on Regional Development.

He is a substitute for the Committee on Budgetary Control and a member of the delegation for relations with the countries of Southeast Asia and the Association of Southeast Asian Nations. He is also a substitute for the delegation to the EU–Kazakhstan, EU–Kyrgyzstan and EU–Uzbekistan Parliamentary Cooperation Committees, and for relations with Tajikistan, Turkmenistan and Mongolia.

Career 
 Highest postgraduate teaching qualification in history (1970)
 Former Chairman of the National Federation of Socialist and Republican Elected Representatives
 Mayor of Quimper (1989–2001 and 2008-2014)
 Member of the French Parliament (1981–1986 and 1988–1993)
 Member of the European Parliament (1999-2009)
 Knight of the Legion of Honour

External links
 Weblog of Bernard Poignant
 Website of Bernard Poignant
 European Parliament biography
 Declaration of financial interests (in French; PDF file)

1945 births
Living people
Politicians from Vannes
MEPs for West France 2004–2009
Socialist Party (France) MEPs
MEPs for France 1999–2004
Rennes 2 University alumni